The CECAFA organised Kagame Interclub Cup is an association football competition that is contested between the champions of the CECAFA affiliated countries plus one guest team.

The 2011 contest took place between 25 June and 10 July 2011.  The Tournament was originally scheduled to be held in Zanzibar, however the Zanzibarian authorities did not have the necessary logistics to host the event and it was handed to Sudan then Tanzania.

Participants

Group A
 Etincelles FC
 Red Sea F.C.
 Simba SC 
 Vital'O F.C.
 Zanzibar Ocean View

Group B
 Al-Merreikh
 Bunamwaya SC
 Elman FC
 Young Africans FC 

Group C
 APR FC
 Ports
 Saint-George SA
 Ulinzi Stars

Group stage

Group A

Group B

Group C

Ranking of third-placed teams
At the end of the first stage, a comparison was made between the third-placed teams of each group. The two best third-placed teams advanced to the quarterfinals.

Knockout stage
All times are East Africa Time (UTC+3)

Notes

References

External links
goalzz.com
 

2011
2011
2011 in African football
2011 in Tanzanian sport